OmaSP Stadion (also known as Seinäjoki Football Stadium) is a football stadium in Seinäjoki, Finland.  It is the home stadium of SJK Seinäjoki of the Veikkausliiga. It is an all-seater stadium with a capacity of 6,000 spectators.

Seinäjoki's American football team Seinäjoki Crocodiles played their home games at OmaSP Stadion during the 2017 season as a part of team's 30th anniversary season.

OmaSP Stadion co-hosted the 2018 UEFA European Under-19 Championship in July 2018.

References

External links
Official site
Stadium information at StadiumDB.com

Football venues in Finland
Seinäjoki
American football venues in Finland
2016 establishments in Finland
Sports venues completed in 2016